Lü Shuxiang (1904–1998) was a Chinese linguist, lexicographer and educator, and founder of Modern Chinese linguistic studies.

Overview
Lü Shuxiang was born in Danyang, Jiangsu Province. He studied Foreign Languages and Literature in the National Central University and graduated in 1926. He then taught in Danyang Middle School and Suzhou High School. In 1936, he went to England for postgraduate studies in the Anthropology Department of Oxford University and then in the Library Science Department of the University of London. He returned to China in 1938 during the war, and held various professorships in Yunnan University, Huaxi Union College and Jinling College, and later, the National Central University.

After the establishment of the People's Republic of China, Lü was a professor in the Chinese Department of Tsinghua University from 1950 to 1952. Starting from 1952, he worked in the Institute of Languages in the Chinese Academy of Sciences. He was a committee member and vice director of the important China Language Reform Commission. From 1978 to 1985, he was the chief editor of the journal Chinese philology. From 1980 to 1985, he was the president of the Association of Chinese Linguistics. He was editor-in-chief of the authoritative Xiandai Hanyu Cidian, and served on the editorial board for the Encyclopedia of China. In 1987, he was awarded honorary Doctor of Literature by the Chinese University of Hong Kong. He was an associate fellow in the Russian Academy of Sciences in 1997.

The artist and art educator Lü Fengzi (1886–1959), and the prominent Buddhist scholar Lü Cheng (1896–1989), were his cousins. In addition, he was the father in law to Chinese physicist Tang Xiaowei and uncle to Peking University educated scholar Lü Qisu.

Main works

Translations
 
  (Ethan Frome)

References

1904 births
1998 deaths
Linguists from China
Educators from Zhenjiang
Writers from Zhenjiang
Academic staff of Yunnan University
Academic staff of the University of Nanking
Academic staff of Tsinghua University
Scientists from Zhenjiang
Foreign Members of the Russian Academy of Sciences
20th-century linguists
People from Danyang